Rick Priestley (born 29 March 1959) is a British game designer and author mainly known as the creator of Warhammer miniature wargame.

Career
Rick Priestley, with Bryan Ansell and Richard Halliwell, designed the Fantasy miniature wargame Warhammer Fantasy Battle for Games Workshop.  The company released the game in 1983.  Priestley also developed a science fiction counterpart for this wargame, which was released as Warhammer 40,000: Rogue Trader in October 1987.  Priestley, with Andy Jones and Marc Gascoigne of Warhammer, developed the idea for the Black Library which, as a result, produced the magazine Inferno! (July 1997–November 2004). In 2000, Priestley designed the 10mm-scale mass combat Fantasy wargame Warmaster.

Rick left Games Workshop in 2009, complaining that the corporate culture had grown too focused on sales and no longer cared about innovation in game design.  He is now co-owner of Warlord Games, and also does consulting work on a freelance basis. He is a consultant at River Horse Games.

At the end of 2011 he was elected to the committee of the Society of Ancients. Priestley helped design the World War II miniature wargame Bolt Action prior to its 1st edition in 2012.  In December 2012 he announced plans to launch a new science fiction game The Gates of Antares with an initial attempt at funding raised through Kickstarter. It was released as Beyond the Gates of Antares through Warlord Games in 2015.

Personal life 
Priestley was born on 29 March 1959 in Lincoln, England. He studied "Archaeology with Classics and Ancient History" at Lancaster University, graduating in 1981. He lives near Nottingham.

Works
Priestley worked extensively for Games Workshop. He is credited with authoring or co-authoring the following games:

Warhammer Fantasy Battle (with Bryan Ansell and Richard Halliwell) 
Terror of the Lichemaster, a set of three linked scenarios using the Warhammer Fantasy Battle rules 
Warhammer Ancient Battles (with Jervis Johnson, Alan and Michael Perry)
 1644
Warhammer 40,000 (with Andy Chambers, Jervis Johnson and Gavin Thorpe in later editions)
Necromunda (with Andy Chambers and Jervis Johnson)
Warmaster (with Alessio Cavatore and Stephan Hess)
Warmaster Ancients
The Alamo: Victory or Death
The Lord of the Rings Strategy Battle Game (with Alessio Cavatore)

Since joining Warlord Games, he has authored or co-authored the following games:

Black Powder (with Jervis Johnson and John Stallard) 
Hail Caesar
 Bolt Action (With Alessio Cavatore)
 Beyond the Gates of Antares
 Warlords of Erehwon
 The Red Book of the Elf King (for Lucid Eye Publications)

References

External links 
 Personal website

Living people
English fantasy writers
Games Workshop
Miniature wargames
1959 births